This article classifies the subgroups of the order Coleoptera (beetles) down to the level of families, following the system in "Family-group names in Coleoptera (Insecta)", Bouchard, et al. (2011), with corrections and additions from 2020, with common names from bugguide.net.

Order Coleoptera
Suborder †Protocoleoptera
Superfamily †Tshekardocoleoidea Rohdendorf, 1944
Family †Tshekardocoleidae Rohdendorf, 1944
Family †Labradorocoleidae Ponomarenko, 1969
Family †Oborocoleidae Kukalová, 1969
Superfamily †Permocupedoidea Martynov, 1933
Family †Permocupedidae Martynov, 1933
Family †Taldycupedidae Rohdendorf, 1961
Superfamily †Permosynoidea Tillyard, 1924
Family †Ademosynidae Ponomarenko, 1968
Family †Permosynidae Tillyard, 1924
Suborder Archostemata
Superfamily Cupedoidea Laporte, 1836
Family Crowsoniellidae Iablokoff-Khnzorian, 1983
Family Cupedidae Laporte, 1836
Family Micromalthidae Barber, 1913 (telephone-pole beetle) 
Family Ommatidae Sharp and Muir, 1912
Family Jurodidae Ponomarenko, 1985
Family †Triadocupedidae Ponomarenko, 1966
Family †Magnocoleidae Hong, 1998
Family †Obrieniidae Zherikhin and Gratshev, 1994
Superfamily †Asiocoleoidea Rohdendorf, 1961
Family †Asiocoleidae Rohdendorf, 1961
Family †Tricoleidae Ponomarenko, 1969
Superfamily †Rhombocoleoidea Rohdendorf, 1961
Family †Rhombocoleidae Rohdendorf, 1961
Superfamily †Schizocoleoidea Rohdendorf, 1961 (formerly Schizophoroidea Ponomarenko, 1968)
Family †Phoroschizidae Bouchard and Bousquet, 2020 (formerly Schizophoridae Ponomarenko, 1968)
Family †Catiniidae Ponomarenko, 1968
Family †Schizocoleidae Rohdendorf, 1961
Suborder Myxophaga
Superfamily Lepiceroidea Hinton, 1936 (1882)
Family Lepiceridae Hinton, 1936 (1882)
Superfamily Sphaeriusoidea Erichson, 1845
Family Torridincolidae Steffan, 1964
Family Hydroscaphidae LeConte, 1874
Family Sphaeriusidae Erichson, 1845
Suborder Adephaga
Family †Tritarsusidae Hong, 2002 (formerly Tritarsidae Hong, 2002)
Family Gyrinidae Latreille, 1810 (whirligig beetles)
Family Trachypachidae Thomson, 1857 (false ground beetles)
Family Rhysodidae Laporte, 1840
Family Carabidae Latreille, 1802 (ground beetles) 
Family Haliplidae Aubé, 1836 (crawling water beetles)
Family †Triaplidae Ponomarenko, 1977
Family †Colymbotethidae Ponomarenko, 1994
Family †Parahygrobiidae Ponomarenko, 1977
Family †Coptoclavidae Ponomarenko, 1961
Family †Liadytidae Ponomarenko, 1977
Family Meruidae Spangler and Steiner, 2005
Family Noteridae Thomson, 1860 (burrowing water beetles)
Family Amphizoidae LeConte, 1853
Family Aspidytidae Ribera, Beutel, Balke and Vogler, 2002
Family Hygrobiidae Régimbart, 1879 (1837)
Family Dytiscidae Leach, 1815 (predaceous diving beetles) 
Suborder Polyphaga
Infraorder Staphyliniformia
Superfamily Histeroidea Gyllenhal, 1808 
Family Histeridae Gyllenhal, 1808
Family Sphaeritidae Shuckard, 1839
Family Synteliidae Lewis, 1882
Superfamily Hydrophiloidea Latreille, 1802 
Family Epimetopidae Zaitzev, 1908
Family Georissidae Laporte, 1840
Family Helophoridae Leach, 1815
Family Hydrochidae Thomson, 1859
Family Hydrophilidae Latreille, 1802 (water scavenger beetles)
Family Spercheidae Erichson, 1837
Superfamily Staphylinoidea Latreille, 1802
Family Hydraenidae Mulsant, 1844
Family Ptiliidae Erichson, 1845
Family Agyrtidae Thomson, 1859
Family Leiodidae Fleming, 1821
Family Silphidae Latreille, 1806
Family Staphylinidae Latreille, 1802 (rove beetles) 
Infraorder Scarabaeiformia
Superfamily Scarabaeoidea Latreille, 1802
Family Pleocomidae LeConte, 1861 (rain beetles)
Family Geotrupidae Latreille, 1802 (earth-boring scarab beetles)
Family Belohinidae Paulian, 1959
Family Passalidae Leach, 1815 (bess beetles)
Family Trogidae MacLeay, 1819 (hide beetles)
Family Glaresidae Prudhomme de Borre, 1886
Family Diphyllostomatidae Holloway, 1972
Family Lucanidae Latreille, 1804 (stag beetles) 
Family Ochodaeidae Streubel, 1846 (sand-loving scarab beetles)
Family Hybosoridae Erichson, 1847
Family Glaphyridae MacLeay, 1819 (bumble bee scarab beetles)
Family Scarabaeidae Latreille, 1802 (scarab beetles)
Family †Coprinisphaeridae Genise, 2004 (ichnotaxon)
Family †Pallichnidae Genise, 2004 (ichnotaxon)
Infraorder Elateriformia
Superfamily Scirtoidea Fleming, 1821
Family Decliniidae Nikitsky, Lawrence, Kirejtshuk and Gratshev, 1994
Family Eucinetidae Lacordaire, 1857
Family Clambidae Fischer von Waldheim, 1821
Family Scirtidae Fleming, 1821
Family †Elodophthalmidae Kirejtshuk and Azar, 2008
Family †Mesocinetidae Kirejtshuk and Ponomarenko, 2010
Superfamily Dascilloidea Guérin-Méneville, 1843 (1834)
Family Dascillidae Guérin-Méneville, 1843 (1834)
Family Rhipiceridae Latreille, 1834
Superfamily Buprestoidea Leach, 1815
Family Schizopodidae LeConte, 1859
Family Buprestidae Leach, 1815 
Superfamily Byrrhoidea Latreille, 1804
Family Byrrhidae Latreille, 1804
Family Protelmidae Jeannel, 1950
Family Elmidae Curtis, 1830
Family Dryopidae Billberg, 1820 (1817)
Family Lutrochidae Kasap and Crowson, 1975
Family Limnichidae Erichson, 1846
Family Heteroceridae MacLeay, 1825
Family Psephenidae Lacordaire, 1854
Family Cneoglossidae Champion, 1897
Family Ptilodactylidae Laporte, 1836
Family Podabrocephalidae Pic, 1930
Family Chelonariidae Blanchard, 1845
Family Eulichadidae Crowson, 1973
Family Callirhipidae Emden, 1924
Superfamily Elateroidea Leach, 1815
Family Artematopodidae Lacordaire, 1857
Family Brachypsectridae Horn, 1881
Family Cantharidae Imhoff, 1856 (1815) (soldier beetles)
Family Cerophytidae Latreille, 1834
Family Elateridae Leach, 1815 (click beetles; includes former Drilidae, Omalisidae, and Plastoceridae) 
Family Eucnemidae Eschscholtz, 1829
Family Lampyridae Rafinesque, 1815 (fireflies)
Family Lycidae Laporte, 1836
Family Omethidae LeConte, 1861 (includes former Telegeusidae)
Family Phengodidae LeConte, 1861
Family Rhagophthalmidae Olivier, 1907
Family Sinopyrophoridae Bi, 2018
Family Throscidae Laporte, 1840 nomen protectum
Family †Berendtimiridae Winkler, 1987
Family †Praelateriidae Dolin, 1973
Superfamily Rhinorhipoidea Lawrence, 1988
Family Rhinorhipidae Lawrence, 1988
Infraorder Bostrichiformia
Superfamily Derodontoidea LeConte, 1861
Family Derodontidae LeConte, 1861
Family Nosodendridae Erichson, 1846
Family Jacobsoniidae Heller, 1926
Superfamily Bostrichoidea Latreille, 1802
Family Dermestidae Latreille, 1804 (carpet beetles) 
Family Endecatomidae LeConte, 1861
Family Bostrichidae Latreille, 1802
Family Ptinidae Latreille, 1802
Infraorder Cucujiformia
Superfamily Lymexyloidea Fleming, 1821
Family Lymexylidae Fleming, 1821
Superfamily Cleroidea Latreille, 1802
Family Phloiophilidae Kiesenwetter, 1863
Family Trogossitidae Latreille, 1802
Family Chaetosomatidae Crowson, 1952
Family Metaxinidae Kolibáč, 2004
Family Thanerocleridae Chapin, 1924
Family Cleridae Latreille, 1802 (checkered beetles)
Family Acanthocnemidae Crowson, 1964
Family Phycosecidae Crowson, 1952
Family Prionoceridae Lacordaire, 1857
Family Mauroniscidae Majer, 1995
Family Melyridae Leach, 1815 (soft-winged flower beetles)
Superfamily Cucujoidea Latreille, 1802
Family †Parandrexidae Kirejtshuk, 1994
Family †Sinisilvanidae Hong, 2002
Family Boganiidae Sen Gupta and Crowson, 1966
Family Byturidae Gistel, 1848
Family Helotidae Chapuis, 1876
Family Protocucujidae Crowson, 1954
Family Sphindidae Jacquelin du Val, 1860
Family Biphyllidae LeConte, 1861
Family Erotylidae Latreille, 1802
Family Monotomidae Laporte, 1840
Family Hobartiidae Sen Gupta and Crowson, 1966
Family Cryptophagidae Kirby, 1826
Family Agapythidae Sen Gupta and Crowson, 1969
Family Priasilphidae Crowson, 1973
Family Phloeostichidae Reitter, 1911
Family Silvanidae Kirby, 1837
Family Cucujidae Latreille, 1802
Family Myraboliidae Lawrence and Britton, 1991
Family Cavognathidae Sen Gupta and Crowson, 1966
Family Lamingtoniidae Sen Gupta and Crowson, 1969
Family Passandridae Blanchard, 1845
Family Phalacridae Leach, 1815
Family Propalticidae Crowson, 1952
Family Laemophloeidae Ganglbauer, 1899
Family Tasmosalpingidae Lawrence and Britton, 1991
Family Cyclaxyridae Gimmel, Leschen and Ślipiński, 2009
Family Kateretidae Kirby, 1837
Family Nitidulidae Latreille, 1802
Family Smicripidae Horn, 1880
Family Bothrideridae Erichson, 1845
Family Cerylonidae Billberg, 1820
Family Alexiidae Imhoff, 1856
Family Discolomatidae Horn, 1878
Family Endomychidae Leach, 1815
Family Coccinellidae Latreille, 1807 (ladybirds or lady beetles) 
Family Corylophidae LeConte, 1852
Family Akalyptoischiidae Lord, Hartley, Lawrence, McHugh, Whiting and Miller, 2010
Family Latridiidae Erichson, 1842
Superfamily Tenebrionoidea Latreille, 1802 
Family Mycetophagidae Leach, 1815
Family Archeocrypticidae Kaszab, 1964
Family Pterogeniidae Crowson, 1953
Family Ciidae Leach, 1819
Family Tetratomidae Billberg, 1820
Family Melandryidae Leach, 1815
Family Mordellidae Latreille, 1802 (tumbling flower beetles)
Family Ripiphoridae Laporte, 1840
Family Zopheridae Solier, 1834
Family Ulodidae Pascoe, 1869
Family Promecheilidae Lacordaire, 1859
Family Chalcodryidae Watt, 1974
Family Trachelostenidae Lacordaire, 1859
Family Tenebrionidae Latreille, 1802 (darkling beetles) 
Family Prostomidae Thomson, 1859
Family Synchroidae Lacordaire, 1859
Family Stenotrachelidae Thomson, 1859
Family Oedemeridae Latreille, 1810
Family Meloidae Gyllenhal, 1810 (blister beetles) 
Family Mycteridae Perty, 1840 (palm beetles and flower beetles) 
Family Boridae Thomson, 1859
Family Trictenotomidae Blanchard, 1845
Family Pythidae Solier, 1834
Family Pyrochroidae Latreille, 1806
Family Salpingidae Leach, 1815
Family Anthicidae Latreille, 1819
Family Aderidae Csiki, 1909
Family Scraptiidae Gistel, 1848
Clade Phytophaga
Superfamily Chrysomeloidea Latreille, 1802
Family Oxypeltidae Lacordaire, 1868
Family Vesperidae Mulsant, 1839
Family Disteniidae Thomson, 1861
Family Cerambycidae Latreille, 1802 (longhorn beetles)
Family Megalopodidae Latreille, 1802
Family Orsodacnidae Thomson, 1859
Family Chrysomelidae Latreille, 1802 (leaf beetles) 
Superfamily Curculionoidea Latreille, 1802
Family Nemonychidae Bedel, 1882
Family Anthribidae Billberg, 1820
Family †Ulyanidae Zherikhin, 1993
Family Belidae Schönherr, 1826
Family Caridae Thompson, 1992
Family Attelabidae Billberg, 1820
Family Brentidae Billberg, 1820
Family Brachyceridae Billberg, 1820
Family Curculionidae Latreille, 1802 (snout beetles, weevils, and bark beetles)

References

 Lawrence, J.F., Newton, A.F. Jr. (1995) Families and subfamilies of Coleoptera (with selected genera, notes, references, and data on family-group names), pp. 779–1006. In: Pakaluk, J., Slipinski, S.A. (eds.), Biology, phylogeny, and classification of Coleoptera: Papers celebrating the 80th birthday of Roy A. Crowson. Muzeum i Instytut Zoologii PAN, Warszawa.
 Ross H. Arnett, Jr. and Michael C. Thomas, American Beetles (CRC Press, 2001–2002)